Victor Bray is an Australian drag racing competitor in the Top Doorslammer class of racing. He drives a 1957 Chevy. A crowd favourite known for huge burnouts and fast times, Victor is considered a pioneer and legend of the sport. He is widely regarded as a key figure in the creation of the Wild Bunch and subsequent Top Doorslammer category in Australian drag racing.

Victor is the owner & principal of Team Bray Racing. Victor has won the Australian Top Doorslammer Championship on six occasions. Team Bray have been sponsored over the years by Castrol, Sidchrome, Gulf Western Oils and Century Batteries.

Victor's son Ben Bray also drives for the team and has also been the Australian champion in Top Doorslammer and Top Alcohol. Together they have 8 ANDRA Pro Series Championships. Ben's son Zac has also entered drag racing in the Junior Dragster category.

The team have taken breaks from racing over the years. Particularly in 2014 while Ben Bray recovered from a serious drag racing accident, returning to racing in 2015; and again from 2017 when Victor battled skin cancer, returning to the track in 2018.

Victor and his team are based in Queensland, which is where he was born and raised - a third-generation tomato farmer.

Personal bests

 PB Elapsed Time: 5.86 seconds
 World Record in 2003: Elapsed Time 5.951 seconds. Speed

Career championships

 1995–96 Australian Top Doorslammer Champion
 1996–97 Australian Top Doorslammer Champion
 1997–98 Australian Top Doorslammer Champion
 1998–99 Australian Top Doorslammer Champion
 1999–00 Australian Top Doorslammer Champion
 2000–01 Australian Top Doorslammer Champion

References

External links 

 Team Bray Racing - Victor Bray

Dragster drivers
Living people
Racing drivers from Queensland
Year of birth missing (living people)
20th-century Australian people